The Medical Witness is a 1971 novel by the British writer Richard Gordon. The story focuses on John Rumbelow, the leading pathologist in the country whose word is often counted on in murder trials.

References

Bibliography
 Peacock, Scott. Contemporary Authors. Cengage Gale, 2002.

1971 British novels
Novels by Richard Gordon
Novels set in London
Heinemann (publisher) books